4th Pakistan Media Awards
January 11, 2014

Best Film: 
Main Hoon Shahid Afridi

Best Drama Serial - Satellite: 
Zindagi Gulzar Hai

Best Drama Serial - Terrestrial: 
Anokha Laadla (season 3)

Best Television Film: 
Behadd

Best Theater Play: 
Pawnay 14 August

The 4th Pakistan Media Awards were held to honor the best in film, television, radio and theater of 2013 in Pakistan. This time the ceremony honored the cinematic achievements of 2013 and 2012. The ceremony was scheduled for 28 December 2013, but, due to overwhelming response from the public on online votings for the public poll of selected online nominations and high demand of public to extend the voting days for nominations,  the ceremony was rescheduled for 11 January 2014 at the Expo Center in Karachi, Sindh. Awards was hosted by Shamoon Abbasi and Faisal Qureshi.

Nominees
These are the nominees for the 4th Pakistan Media Awards.

Film

Television

Radio

Theater

Multiple Nominations

Film with Multiple nominations

The following 4 films received multiple nominations:

Film with multiple wins

 2: Main Hoon Shahid Afridi

Television with multiple nominations

The following 13 Dramas received multiple nominations:

Television with multiple wins
 3: Zindagi Gulzar Hai

Special awards

Best emerging Talent Male
 Nauman Habib & Furqan Khan

Best emerging Talent Female
 Ushna Shah & Maheen Khalid

Longest Drama series of era
 Yeh Zindagi Hai –Saud & Javeria Saud

Lifetime Achievement Honour

 Anwar Maqsood  - Exceptional contribution to Theater.

References

External links 

 Official Websites
 PMA Official website

 News resources
 4th Pakistan Media Awards Showbiz Pak
 Pakistan Media Awards Stargez of metiers Renowns Cybo Tainment

 Analysis
 Pakistan Media Award Conversation Pedia Media

 Other resources
 Pakistan Media Awards at Popbluster

2013 in Pakistani television
2013 film awards
2013 in Pakistan
2013 in theatre
2013 in radio
2013 television awards